Paul O'Neill (born May 8, 1965) is an American gymnast most noted for his work on rings.

Early life and education
O'Neill was born to Evelyn and John O'Neill, one of the family's four sons. He attended Abraham Lincoln High School for two years and Aurora Central for one.  He was State Champion on rings in 1983.  He went to Houston Baptist University from 1985 to 1987 and the University of New Mexico from 1987 to 1989.

Gymnastics career
O'Neill was a three-time NCAA champion on rings, winning in 1987, 1988, and 1989, as well as holding the highest qualifying average record (9.93) in 1987 and 1989. After college, he went on to compete internationally. O'Neill came fourth at the 1992 World Artistic Gymnastics Championships, the highest American male finisher, then became the first American man to win a medal at the world championships in 15 years when he won the silver medal in men's rings at the 1994 World Artistic Gymnastics Championships in Brisbane.

was USA Gymnastics male athlete of the year in 1994.

Competitions
World Championships, Brisbane, Australia - Silver Medalist 
World Championships, Paris, France - 4th (Rings) 
D.T.B Pokal, Stuttgart, Germany, 1995 - 3rd (Still Rings) 
D.T.B Pokal, Stuttgart, Germany, 1994 - 5th (Still Rings) 
Swiss Cup, Zurich, Switzerland, 1995 - 7th (Still Rings) 
Swiss Cup, Zurich, Switzerland, 1994 - 8th (Still Rings)
Kosice Cup, Kosice, Slovakia, 1993 - 1st (Still Rings)

The "O'Neill"
The still rings element the O'Neill is named after him; it consists of a stretched double felge backward to hang and was first performed by O'Neill at the 1992 World Artistic Gymnastics Championships in Paris.

Personal life
O'Neill was married to Kristi Kasprzak O'Neill. He had three children: Geno, Demi and Christian.

He owned his own personal training company, and he has also done some acting and modelling. His hobbies include singing in a band.  Paul died 01/22/2021.

References

External links
USA Gymnastics Official Biography: Paul O'Neill

1965 births
Living people
American male artistic gymnasts
Medalists at the World Artistic Gymnastics Championships
Originators of elements in artistic gymnastics
Houston Baptist Huskies men's gymnasts
New Mexico Lobos men's gymnasts
Sportspeople from Denver
20th-century American people
21st-century American people